Events from the year 1622 in Denmark.

Incumbents 
 Monarch – Christian IV
 Steward of the Realm;

Events 

Undated
 Christian IV invites Jews to settle in Denmark.
 Christian IV establishes a new deer park at present-day Charlottenlund Palace, which wisto replace Rosenborg Deer Park at Rosenborg Castle just outside Copenhagen.
 The Matthias Hansen House on Amagertorv in Copenhagen is built.
 The Neptune Fountain is installed in the forecourt of Frederiksborg Vastle.

Births 
 4 October – Christen Sørensen Longomontanus, astronomer (died 1748)

Undated
 Valdemar Christian of Schleswig-Holstein, son of Christian IV (died 1656)

Deaths 
Undated
 Christoffer Dybvad, mathematician (born 1578)

Publications
 Christen Sørensen Longomontanus: Astronomia Danica, etc. (1622)
 Christen Sørensen Longomontanus: 
 Christen Sørensen Longomontanus: Disputationes quatuor Astrologicae (1622)

Rxternal links

References 

 
Denmark
Years of the 17th century in Denmark